Salmaneh may refer to:
 Salmaneh, Khuzestan